The 1994 Men's Hockey Asia Cup was the fourth tournament to date in Hockey Asia Cup for men. It was held from November 5 to November 14, 1994 in Hiroshima, Japan. The winner of this tournament qualified for the 1998 Men's Hockey World Cup in Netherlands. South Korea defeated India 1–0 in the final to win their First title.

Results 
All times are (UTC+8).

Group stage

Pool A 

Pool B

Fifth to eighth place classification

First to fourth classification

Semi-finals

Third and fourth place

Final
South Korea won their first Asia Cup hockey title defeating India 1–0 with captain Park Sin-heung scoring the winner for them when he scored off a penalty stroke in the 56th minute.

Final standings

References 

http://www.rediff.com/sports/asiacup94.htm

Hockey Asia Cup
1994 in Japanese sport
Asia Cup
International field hockey competitions hosted by Japan